Apkallu (Akkadian) and Abgal (Sumerian:	) are terms found in cuneiform inscriptions that in general mean either "wise" or "sage".

In several contexts the Apkallu are seven demi-gods, sometimes described as part man and part fish, associated with human wisdom; these creatures are often referred to in scholarly literature as the Seven Sages. Sometimes the sages are associated with a specific primeval king. After the deluge (see Epic of Gilgamesh), further sages and kings are listed. Post-deluge, the sages are considered human, and in some texts are distinguished by being referred to as Ummanu, not Apkallu.

The terms Apkallu (as well as Abgal) is also used as an epithet for kings and gods as a mark of wisdom or knowledge.

A further use of the term Apkallu is when referring to figurines used in apotropaic rituals; these figurines include fish-man hybrids representing the seven sages, but also include bird-headed and other figures.

In a later work by Berossus describing Babylonia, the Apkallu appear again, also described as fish-men who are sent by the gods to impart knowledge to people. In Berossus, the first one, Oannes (a variant of Uanna), is said to have taught people the creation myth the Enuma Elis.

Etymology, names, and meaning

The term apkallu has multiple uses, but usually refers to some form of wisdom; translations of the term generally equate to English language uses of the terms "the wise", "sage" or "expert".

As an epithet, prefix, or adjective it can mean "the wise"; it has been used as an epithet for the gods Ea and Marduk, simply interpreted as "wise one amongst gods" or similar forms. It has also been applied to Enlil, Ninurta, and Adad.

The term also refers to the "seven sages", especially the sage Adapa, and also to apotropaic figures, which are often figurines of the 'seven sages' themselves.

A collation of the names and "titles" of theses seven sages in order can be given as:

Uanna, "who finished the plans for heaven and earth",
Uannedugga, "who was endowed with comprehensive intelligence",
Enmedugga, "who was allotted a good fate",
Enmegalamma, "who was born in a house",
Enmebulugga, "who grew up on pasture land",
An-Enlilda, "the conjurer of the city of Eridu",
Utuabzu, "who ascended to heaven".

Additionally, the term is used when referring to human "priests" (also "exorcists", "diviners"). However, Mesopotamian human sages also used the term ummianu (ummânù).
 
The term "apkallu" is Akkadian, it is thought to derive from the Sumerian abgal.

Uanna (Oannes) or Adapa?

The first of these legendary fish-man sages is known as Oan/Oannes (Sumerian) or Uanna/U-An (Akkadian); on a few cuneiform inscriptions this first sage has "adapa" appended to his name. Borger notes, however, that it is difficult to believe that the half-man half-fish "Adapa" is the same as the fisherman of the Adapa myth, the son of the god Ea. A potential solution was given by W. G. Lambert—evidence that "adapa" was also used as an appellative meaning "wise".

 considers the case for Adapa being one of or a name of one of the Apkallu. They note that while some texts contain plays on words between the terms "adapa" and "uan" and posit that "adapa" may be an epithet, though in the Adapa myth itself it is likely a proper name. In terms of the name of the first Apkallu they consider that both terms "adapa" ("wise") and "ummanu" ("craftsman") together form the whole proper name. Additionally, they note closer similarities between the 7th Apkallu Utuabzu, who is said to have ascended to heaven (in the Bit Meseri), and the myth of Adapa who also visited heaven. Both Adapa and the Apkallu have legends that place them halfway between the world of men and gods; but additionally just as Oannes in the Greek version passes all the knowledge of civilization to people, so Adapa is described as having been "[made] perfect with broad understanding to reveal the plans of the land." However, despite some clear parallels between Adapa stories and both the first and last Apkallu, Kvanvig finally notes that the name used for the first Apkallu is given in both Berossus, and in the Uruk King list—that is Uan.

Literary evidence

Uruk List of Kings and Sages
These Sages are found in the "Uruk List of Kings and Sages" (165 BC) discovered in 1959/60 in the Seleucid era temple of Anu in Bit Res; The text consisted of list of seven kings and their associated sages, followed by a note on the 'Deluge' (see Gilgamesh flood myth), followed by eight more king/sage pairs.

A tentative translation reads:

{{quote box|

During the reign of Ayalu, the king, [Adapa]† was sage.

During the reign of Alalgar, the king, Uanduga was sage.

During the reign of Ameluana, the king, Enmeduga was sage.

During the reign of Amegalana, the king, Enmegalama was sage.

During the reign of Enmeusumgalana, the king, Enmebuluga was sage.

During the reign of Dumuzi, the shepherd, the king, Anenlilda was sage.

During the reign of Enmeduranki, the king, Utuabzu was sage.

After the flood, during the reign of Enmerkar, the king, Nungalpirigal was sage, whom Istar brought down from heaven to Eana. He made the bronze lyre [..] according to the technique of Ninagal. [..] The lyre was placed before Anu [..], the dwelling of (his) personal god.

During the reign of Gilgamesh, the king, Sin-leqi-unnini was scholar.

During the reign of Ibbi-Sin, the king, Kabti-ili-Marduk was scholar.

During the reign of Isbi-Erra, the king, Sidu, a.k.a. Enlil-ibni, was scholar.

During the reign of Abi-esuh, the king, Gimil-Gula and Taqis-Gula were the scholars.

During the reign of [...], the king, Esagil-kin-apli was scholar.

During the reign of Adad-apla-iddina, the king, Esagil-kin-ubba was scholar.

During the reign of Nebuchadnezzar, the king, Esagil-kin-ubba was scholar.

During the reign of Esarhaddon, the king, Aba-Enlil-dari was scholar, whom the Arameans call Ahiqar.

† Note the root for this word is the same (Iu4-4+60) as that for the following sage Uanduga (Iu4-4+60-du10-ga) ie the translation to Adapa is interpretive, not literally 'phonetic'''
|align=left
|source = 
}}

Lenzi notes that the list is clearly intended to be taken in chronological order. It is an attempt to connect real (historic) kings directly to mythologic (divine) kingship and also does the same connecting those real king's sages (ummanu) with the demi-godly mythic seven sages (apkallu).

Though the list is taken to be chronological, the texts do not portray the Sages (nor the kings) as genealogically related to each other or their kings. There is some similarity between the sages' and kings' names in the list, but not enough to draw any solid conclusions.

Bit meseri
A list (similar to the Uruk list) of the seven sages followed by four human sages is also given in an apotropaic incantation the tablet series Bit meseri. The ritual involved hanging or placing statues of the sages on the walls of a house. A translation of the cuneiform was given by Borger:

Borger found the Uruk and bit meseri lists to be in agreement.

The Twenty-One "Poultices"

A text giving the story known as the Twenty-One "Poultices" (ref. no. Another text from Uruk was later found that duplicated and further completed the coverage of Reiner's text.

In the twenty-one poultices text the seven sages (of Eridu) are entrusted with the reading "tablets of destiny." Additionally the sage Anenlilda is the maker of the 'twenty-one poultices' -- these items are then given to Nudimmud to bring to the "upper world" to gain merit.

The Poem of Erra

The seven sages are also mentioned in the Epic of Erra (aka 'Song of Erra', or 'Erra and Ishum'); here again they are referenced as paradu-Fish. In this text is described how after the Flood, Marduk banished them back to Abzu. Once the apkallu are banished, Marduk's phrasing becomes rhetorical (left):

Finally Erra persuades Marduk to leave his temple and fetch back the apkallu from their banishment, reassuring that he will keep order whilst Marduk is away. However, chaos breaks out; though some of the text is missing it seems that the subsequent outcome was that instead, earthly ummanus are given the task of cleansing Marduk's shrine. Kvanvig infers from this text that the mythological role of the apkallu was to aid the god (Marduk) in keeping creation stable by maintenance of Marduk's idol.

According to Scott B. Noegel this epic also contains several clever etymological wordplays on the names of apkallu, both textual and phonetic.

This text appears to have a completely different role for the apkallu from that given in the lists of sages and kings—essentially, Kvanvig proposes that the pre-deluge king-sage list was retroactively inserted onto a Sumerian king list, so to combine the historical record with the flood legend. In doing so it creates a pre-flood origin story for the Sumerian kings.

Building stories

A Sumerian temple hymn states the seven sages (here as abgal) enlarged a temple.
 
The seven sages were also associated with the founding of the seven cities of Eridu, Ur, Nippur, Kullab, Kesh, Lagash, and Shuruppak; and in the Epic of Gilgamesh (Gilg. I 9; XI 305) they are credited with laying the foundations of Uruk.

Berossus' Babyloniaca

Berossus wrote a history of Babylon in around 281 BC, during the Hellenistic period. According to his own account, he was a Chaldean priest of Bel (Marduk). His Babyloniaca was written in Greek, probably for the Seleucid court of Antiochus I. His work gives a description of the wise men, their names, and their associated kings.  Berossus' original book is now lost, but parts have survived via the abridgment and copying of historians including Alexander Polyhistor, Josephus, Abydenus, and Eusebius. Mayer Burstein suggests that Berossus' work was partly metaphorical, intended to convey wisdoms concerning the development of man—a nuance lost or uncommented on by later copyists.

What remains of Berossos' account via Apollodorus begins with a description on Babylonia, followed by the appearance of a learned fish-man creature named Oannes. Truncated account:

Truncated account via Abydenus:

Truncated account via Alexander Polyhistor:

In summary, Berossus' Babylonian history recounts ten kings before a deluge (followed by the reigns of later kings), with a record or myth of primitive man receiving civilized knowledge via the Oannes; in also contains a paraphrasing of the myth the Enuma Elis, which was said to have been recounted by the Oannes. Though Berossus' history contains obvious historical errors, parts of it have convincing matches with ancient cuneiform texts, suggest he was recreating accounts known from ancient Mesopotamian texts. Mayer Burstein considers that the text was not well written in a "Greek style", but was essentially a transliteration of Mesopotamian myths into Greek. Helpfully for future historians, Berossus does not seem to have altered the myths or narratives to suit a Greek audience.

In terms of his relevance to the Apkallu: his lists match fairly well with the Uruk King/Apkallu list, though there are differences and variations. Oannes is paired with the king Alorus, and by comparison can be considered equivalent to Adapa [Uanna]. Matches between Berossus and the kings and apkallu in the Uruk King List have been proposed.

 Other references 
Various other cuneiform texts have references to these seven sages. There are texts that associates a set of seven sages with the city Kuar-Eridu or Eridu, while in the Epic of Gilgamesh there is a reference to seven counselors as founders of Uruk. Another list of seven sages used in a ritual differs from the description and names give in the Bit meseri text.

Several of named apkulla are listed on inscriptions as authors, notably Lu-Nanna is recorded as author of the Myth of Etana.

 Depictions in ancient art 

Representations of 'apkallu' were used in apotropaic rituals; in addition to fish-headed ones (similar to descriptions of the seven sages), other human-animal hybrids were used as 'apkallu' in this context (generally bird-headed humans).

Apkallu reliefs appear prominently in Neo-Assyrian palaces, notably the constructions of Ashurnasirpal II of the 9th century BC. They appear in one of three forms, bird-headed, human-headed or dressed in fish-skin cloaks. They have also been found on reliefs from the reign of Sennacherib. The form taken of a man covered with the 'pelt' of a fish is first seen the Kassite period, continuing is used to the period of Persian Babylonia – the form was popular during the Neo-Assyrian and Neo-Babylonian periods.

Gallery
Probable depictions of Apkallu

Speculation

The spread of the 'seven sage' legend westwards during the 1st and 2nd millennia has been speculated to have led to the creation of the tale of the Nephilim (Genesis 6:1-4) as recounted in the Old Testament, and may have an echo in the text of the Book of Proverbs (Prov 9:1): "Wisdom built her house. She set out its seven pillars." The story of Enoch ("seventh from Adam") and his ascension to heaven has also been proposed to be a variant or influenced by the seventh apkallu Utuabzu who is also said to have ascended to heaven in the bit meseri.

Misconceptions
Oannes was once conjectured to be a form or another name of the ancient Babylonian god Ea. It is now thought that the name is the Greek form of the Babylonian Uanna'', an Apkallu.

See also
 Atra-Hasis, meaning "very wise": in the eponymous legend he is survivor of a deluge
 Ašipu, Mesopotamian vocation of scholar/doctor/magician, sometimes referred to as exorcists
 Dagon, Mesopotamian and Canaanite fish-like deity, associated with clouds and fertity
 Kulullû, a different type of Mesopotamian fish-human hybrid
 Saptarishi, seven sages of Vedic literature
 Sumerian king list

References

Citations

Sources

 also reproduced in English translation in

External links 
 "abgal" search at the Electronic Text Corpus of Sumerian Literature

Mesopotamian deities
Mythological aquatic creatures
Mythological human hybrids
Piscine and amphibian humanoids